Alyansa Tigil Mina (abbreviated as ATM) is an environmental advocacy organization that campaigns to protect communities and the environment from the ill effects of large-scale mining operations in the Philippines. It is a coalition composed of nongovernmental organizations, church groups, and academic institutions and is the largest anti-mining advocacy network in the country. Alyansa Tigil Mina began as a loose collective that began meeting in 2004 to address threats posed to sustainable development initiatives by the revival of mining operations in the Philippines.

Alyansa Tigil Mina takes part in campaigns for environmental protection and Indigenous people's rights. The alliance calls for a nationwide moratorium on large-scale mining operations; the passage of an Alternative People's Mining Act as well as the scrapping of the Philippine Mining Act of 1995; and rejection of the National Policy Agenda on Revitalizing Mining in the Philippines and the National Minerals Action Plan.

Alyansa Tigil Mina participated in the Earth Strike international movement for climate action. It also joined environmentalist Gina Lopez and other groups in launching the "No to Mining in Palawan" signature campaign in 2011 following the murder of radio broadcaster and anti-mining activist Gerry Ortega.

In 2021, Alyansa Tigil Mina was among the 74 groups who signed a letter sent to Department of Environment and Natural Resources officials to oppose offshore magnetite mining in Cagayan province.

See also 
Sibuyanons Against Mining

References

See also
Ecology
Environmental organizations based in the Philippines
Advocacy groups in the Philippines